Department of Higher Education may refer to:

India
 Department of Higher Education (India)
 Department of Higher Education (Haryana)
 Department of Higher Education (Odisha)
 Department of Higher Education (Tamil Nadu)

Other places
 Department of Higher Education (Malaysia)
 Department of Higher Education (Myanmar)
 Colorado Department of Higher Education